Loliginidae, commonly known as pencil squids, is an aquatic family of squid classified in the order Myopsida.

Taxonomy
The family Loliginidae was formerly classified in the order Teuthida.

Taxonomic list

The classification below follows Vecchione et al. (2005) and the Tree of Life Web Project (2010).

Several doubtfully distinct species have also been described; see the genus articles for these.

Genus Afrololigo
Afrololigo mercatoris, Guinean thumbstall squid
Genus Alloteuthis
Alloteuthis africanus, African squid
Alloteuthis media, midsize squid
Alloteuthis subulata, European common squid
Genus Doryteuthis
Subgenus Amerigo
Doryteuthis gahi, Patagonian squid
Doryteuthis ocula, bigeye inshore squid
Doryteuthis opalescens, opalescent inshore squid
Doryteuthis pealeii, longfin inshore squid
Doryteuthis surinamensis, Surinam squid
Subgenus Doryteuthis
Doryteuthis plei, slender inshore squid
Doryteuthis roperi, Roper inshore squid
Subgenus unnamed
Doryteuthis sanpaulensis, São Paulo squid
Genus Heterololigo
Heterololigo bleekeri, spear squid
Genus Loligo
Loligo forbesii, veined squid
Loligo reynaudii, Cape Hope squid or chokka
Loligo vulgaris, European squid
Genus Loliolus
Subgenus Loliolus
Loliolus affinis
Loliolus hardwickei
Subgenus Nipponololigo
Loliolus beka, Beka squid
Loliolus japonica, Japanese squid
Loliolus sumatrensis, Kobi squid
Loliolus uyii, little squid
Genus Lolliguncula
Subgenus Loliolopsis
Lolliguncula diomedeae, dart squid or shortarm gonate squid
Subgenus Lolliguncula
Lolliguncula argus
Lolliguncula brevis, Atlantic brief squid
Lolliguncula panamensis, Panama brief squid
Genus Pickfordiateuthis
Pickfordiateuthis bayeri
Pickfordiateuthis pulchella, grass squid
Pickfordiateuthis vossi
Pickfordiateuthis sp. A
Genus Sepioteuthis
Sepioteuthis australis, southern reef squid or southern calamary
Sepioteuthis lessoniana, bigfin reef squid or northern calamary
Sepioteuthis sepioidea, Caribbean reef squid
Genus Uroteuthis
Subgenus Aestuariolus
Uroteuthis noctiluca, luminous bay squid
Subgenus Photololigo
Uroteuthis abulati
Uroteuthis arabica
Uroteuthis bengalensis
Uroteuthis chinensis, mitre squid
Uroteuthis duvaucelii, Indian squid
Uroteuthis edulis, swordtip squid
Uroteuthis robsoni
Uroteuthis sibogae, Siboga squid
Uroteuthis singhalensis, long barrel squid
Uroteuthis vossi
Subgenus Uroteuthis
Uroteuthis bartschi, Bartsch's squid
Subgenus incertae sedis
Uroteuthis pickfordi, Siboga squid
Uroteuthis reesi

References

External links

Tree of Life web project: Loliginidae

Squid
Cephalopod families